David James Sexton  (6 April 1930 – 25 November 2012) was an English football manager and player. He was notable for managing Chelsea to their first ever major European trophy.

Playing career

Son of former professional boxer Archie Sexton, he started his professional career with Luton Town in 1951, following spells with non-league clubs Newmarket Town and Chelmsford City. Playing mainly at inside-forward, he would finish his career with time at West Ham United, Leyton Orient, Brighton and Hove Albion, and Crystal Palace. His biggest success came at Brighton, where he won the Third Division (South) Title in 1957–58.

Coaching and managerial career
Sexton started off as a coach at Chelsea, before leaving to begin his managerial career at Leyton Orient in 1965. In 1966 he was appointed by Arsenal manager Bertie Mee as the Gunners' first-team coach, but a year later returned to Chelsea to become manager following the departure of Tommy Docherty. He led the club to FA Cup success in 1970 and the European Cup Winners' Cup a year later. Chelsea also reached the League Cup final in 1972, but lost to Stoke City. However, Sexton fell out with several players, including Peter Osgood and Alan Hudson, who were subsequently sold. This, combined with other problems at the club, ensured that Sexton did not come close to repeating his earlier success and early in the 1974–75 season – which ended in Chelsea's relegation – he was dismissed.

A few weeks later in October 1974 he was appointed manager of Queens Park Rangers as successor to Gordon Jago. With a team containing the likes of Stan Bowles and Gerry Francis, as well as players recruited from ex-club Chelsea, John Hollins and David Webb, Sexton took Rangers to within a point of the League title in 1975–76. The 3–2 defeat at Norwich City in their final away game of that season marked the end of a 14-match unbeaten run which had produced a spectacular 13 wins and one draw. They were top after playing their final home game versus Leeds United on 24 April 1976, but Liverpool's late 3–1 win over Wolverhampton Wanderers on 4 May 1976 denied them their first-ever league title. Still, second place was – and remains – their highest league finish. UEFA Cup qualification came as consolation.

Sexton took over at Manchester United – again succeeding Tommy Docherty – in the middle of 1977 but his reign was characterised by dour football and he was not popular with the fans. In appointing Sexton it appeared as if the United board had again opted for safety following the tumultuous tenure of Docherty (sacked for having an affair with the wife of the club's physiotherapist), whose four-and-a-half-year spell had overseen relegation from the First Division but an immediate comeback followed by high league finishes and completed with an FA Cup triumph in the season before Sexton's appointment.

The highlight was an FA Cup final appearance in 1979, losing 3–2 to Arsenal in a dramatic match, and finishing as league runners-up to Liverpool in 1979–80. His signings brought mixed success. Midfielder Ray Wilkins was bought from Chelsea in 1979 and soon established himself as one of Europe's finest midfielders, and striker Joe Jordan scored more than 50 goals in three years after arriving from Leeds United in 1978. On a less positive note, Sexton paid a club record £1.25 million for Nottingham Forest striker Garry Birtles in 1980, but a player who had been one of the country's finest goalscorers with his old club failed to find the net once in 25 league appearances during the 1980–81 season.

Sexton was dismissed on 30 April 1981, despite having won his final seven games in charge, as United had finished eighth in the league and Sexton had now been in charge of them for four seasons without winning a major trophy. The FA Cup final appearance two years earlier and the narrow second-place finish behind Liverpool a year earlier was of little consolation.

A few weeks after being dismissed, he was appointed as manager of Coventry City. In his first season, he managed a relatively average 14th-place finish (which was still a slight improvement on the previous year), and the club appeared to be making progress, with the side mounting a serious challenge for the UEFA Cup places halfway through the 1982–83 season. However, a disastrous end to the campaign saw them win just once in their last fifteen games, with the club only avoiding relegation in the penultimate game of the season, which led to Sexton's dismissal. This would prove to be his last role in club management.

Sexton also had a very successful period as coach of the England's Under-21 side, and won the UEFA Under 21s Championship twice, in 1982 and 1984. After that he went on the become the FA's first Technical Director at the FA's National School at Lilleshall in 1984. He also wrote a book on coaching a football team for coaches of all levels called "Tackle Soccer."

He later lived in Kenilworth, Warwickshire, where in 2008 he was commemorated with a new building in the town centre. He lived in Kenilworth after becoming Coventry City manager in 1981 and the building in his honour, Sexton House, is a refurbished building divided between shops and offices.

Honours

Player
Leyton Orient
Third Division South (1): 1954–55

Brighton & Hove Albion
Third Division South (1): 1957–58

Manager
Chelsea
FA Cup (1): 1969–70
European Cup Winners' Cup (1): 1970–71
Football League First Division third-place: 1969-1970
Football League Cup runner up: 1971-1972
FA Charity Shield runner up: 1970

Manchester United
FA Charity Shield (1): 1977 (shared)
Football League First Division runner up: 1979-1980
FA Cup runner up: 1978-1979

England Under-21
UEFA U21 Championship (2): 1982, 1984

Individual
Officer of the Order of the British Empire (OBE), for services to football: 2005

Managerial statistics

References

External links

1930 births
2012 deaths
Place of death missing
Footballers from Islington (district)
People educated at St Ignatius' College, Enfield
Officers of the Order of the British Empire
English footballers
Newmarket Town F.C. players
Chelmsford City F.C. players
Luton Town F.C. players
West Ham United F.C. players
Leyton Orient F.C. players
Brighton & Hove Albion F.C. players
Crystal Palace F.C. players
English football managers
Leyton Orient F.C. managers
Chelsea F.C. managers
Queens Park Rangers F.C. managers
Manchester United F.C. managers
Coventry City F.C. managers
Arsenal F.C. non-playing staff
Aston Villa F.C. non-playing staff
Chelsea F.C. non-playing staff
England national under-21 football team managers
Association football forwards